Garrett Andrew Olson (born October 18, 1983) is an American former professional baseball pitcher. He played in Major League Baseball (MLB) for the Baltimore Orioles, Seattle Mariners, Pittsburgh Pirates and New York Mets and in the KBO League for the Doosan Bears.

Early life

High school
Olson attended Buchanan High School in Clovis, California. He played for the Anchorage Bucs in the Alaska Baseball League in 2004, going 7–0 with a 0.88 ERA, and was a Summer League First-Team All-American starting pitcher.

College
He attended Cal Poly-San Luis Obispo for college, where in his last year he was 12–4 with a 2.71 ERA. In 2005, he was a Big West Conference All-Star starting pitcher.

Professional career

Baltimore Orioles 
Olson was drafted by the Baltimore Orioles as a sandwich pick between the first and second rounds (48th overall) of the 2005 MLB Draft. During the 2005 season, he played mostly with the Aberdeen IronBirds, moving to the Frederick Keys in August. In 2006, he advanced to the Double-A Bowie Baysox, and was named the Baltimore Orioles Minor League Player of the Year. Olson was invited to the All-Star Futures Game. 
Through 2007, Olson was 21–17 with a 2.95 ERA, and averaged 7.37 hits and 8.82 strikeouts per nine innings during his minor league career. He was mentioned, but did not participate in the  All-Star Futures Game, representing the United States team.

Olson was promoted from the Triple-A Norfolk Tides to take the place of injured Orioles starter Steve Trachsel, and he made his major league debut on Independence Day of 2007 against the Chicago White Sox. He would have earned the win in his debut, but he only pitched  innings, falling two outs shy of the five innings required to qualify for a win. He earned his first career win in his next start, also against the White Sox, on July 15, giving up two runs in  innings, both on solo home runs by Jermaine Dye, and the Orioles went on to win 5–3.

Olson committed his first career error in his debut on July 4. After allowing the first batter he faced in his career, left fielder Andy González, to reach base via a walk, he made a throwing error on a pickoff attempt, allowing Gonzalez to reach second base. His first career strikeout came three batters later, as Paul Konerko was called out on a 2–2 pitch.

On September 1, 2007, Olson made a start at Fenway Park against the Boston Red Sox, where he was the opposing pitcher in Clay Buchholz's no-hitter. On June 28, 2008, Olson earned his first career hit vs. the Washington Nationals against Jesús Colomé in the sixth inning.

He went to 3–0 on 8% of all batters he faced in 2008, the highest percentage in the majors.

Seattle Mariners 
 
On January 18, Olson was traded to the Chicago Cubs with a minor-leaguer for Félix Pie. Just 10 days later, he was traded along with Ronny Cedeño to the Seattle Mariners for Aaron Heilman. On April 1, 2009, Olson was optioned to Triple-A Tacoma to begin the season. He was called up on May 6 because of an injury to relief pitcher Shawn Kelley. Olson soon took the rotation spot from teammate Chris Jakubauskas.

He compiled a 3.72 ERA in 12 relief appearances covering 19 innings. In 11 starts, he is 3–5 with a 6.49 ERA through August 10. Eventually, Olson was moved the bullpen to become a reliever. He stated that he felt comfortable in both roles. Olson was again optioned to Triple-A Tacoma on August 20 to clear roster space for Infielder Bill Hall.

On September 13, Olson was called up again to the Mariners, marking his third stint with the team in 2009. With Tacoma, Olson went 2–3 with a 4.94 ERA and notched the Rainiers' only playoff win against the Sacramento River Cats.

Pittsburgh Pirates 
On March 18, 2011, the Mariners placed Olson on waivers. He was later claimed off waivers by the Pittsburgh Pirates. He was designated for assignment on April 17.

New York Mets 
Olson signed a minor league contract with the New York Mets on December 12, 2011. Olson began the year with Triple-A Buffalo.
On August 7, 2012, Olson was called up from Triple-A to replace the injured Tim Byrdak. Olson made his Mets debut on August 8, pitching one third of an inning, giving up four earned runs against the Miami Marlins. Olson was designated for assignment on August 11 to create room on the roster for Johan Santana. In October 2012, Olson elected minor league free agency.

Oakland Athletics 
In December 2012, Olson signed with the Oakland Athletics.

Doosan Bears 
On March 16, 2013, Olson was released by the Athletics to allow him to sign a contract with the Doosan Bears in the Korea Baseball Organization. He was released from Doosan in July 2013.

Personal life
He currently resides in Carson City, Nevada with his wife and daughter. He majored in mechanical engineering in college and he works for Baker Hughes in Minden, Nevada as a mechanical engineer.

References

External links

Career statistics and player information from Korea Baseball Organization

1983 births
Living people
Baltimore Orioles players
Seattle Mariners players
Pittsburgh Pirates players
New York Mets players
Baseball players from California
Cal Poly Mustangs baseball players
Major League Baseball pitchers
Sportspeople from Clovis, California
Sportspeople from Fresno, California
Frederick Keys players
Aberdeen IronBirds players
Bowie Baysox players
Norfolk Tides players
Tacoma Rainiers players
Indianapolis Indians players
Buffalo Bisons (minor league) players
Doosan Bears players
KBO League pitchers
American expatriate baseball players in South Korea
Anchorage Bucs players